The Fly River roundleaf bat (Hipposideros muscinus) is a species of bat in the family Hipposideridae. It is found in West Papua, Indonesia and Papua New Guinea.

Taxonomy
The Fly River roundleaf bat was described as a new species in 1886 by British mammalogist Oldfield Thomas and Italian naturalist Giacomo Doria. They initially placed it in the now-defunct genus Phyllorhina, with a scientific name of Phyllorhina muscina. The holotype had been collected by Luigi D'Albertis along the Fly River of Papua New Guinea. In 1941, George Henry Hamilton Tate divided the genus Hipposideros into species groups of morphologically similar species. He named one group the Hipposideros muscinus group: in it, he placed the Fly River roundleaf bat, Semon's leaf-nosed bat (H. semoni), Wollaston's roundleaf bat (H. wollastoni), and the northern leaf-nosed bat (H. stenotis).
In 1963, however, John Edwards Hill included the Fly River roundleaf bat as part of the Hipposideros cyclops species group along with all previous members of the H. muscinus group, as well as H. cyclops and H. camerunensis.

Description

Range and habitat
The Fly River roundleaf bat is found only on the island of New Guinea, where its range includes both Indonesia and Papua New Guinea. It is found in forested habitat.

Conservation
As of 2017, the Fly River roundleaf bat is evaluated as a least-concern species by the IUCN—its lowest conservation priority.

References

Hipposideros
Bats of Oceania
Mammals of Papua New Guinea
Mammals of Western New Guinea
Mammals described in 1886
Taxonomy articles created by Polbot
Bats of Southeast Asia
Taxa named by Oldfield Thomas
Taxa named by Giacomo Doria
Bats of New Guinea